Filip Tegstedt (born August 31, 1978) is a Swedish film director, known for the Swedish language horror film Marianne (2011) which premiered at the 2011 Fantasia International Film Festival.

Influences
Originally from a small town in the Östersund region of Sweden, Tegstedt has been interested in films from a young age. Having studied screenwriting academically, Filip refined his craft through guerrilla film-making. He has made  short films and a Swedish language web series, and also worked as a production assistant on a number of film and television productions.

His experiences have influenced his work in Marianne. For instance, he has described his movie as an anti-Tim Burton film, reasoning that Marianne, filmed in the snowy North of Sweden looks bright, but feels dark.

Filmography
Marianne  (2011)

References

External links
 

1978 births
Horror film directors
Living people
Swedish film directors